Jean Tinguely (22 May 1925 – 30 August 1991) was a Swiss sculptor best known for his kinetic art sculptural machines (known officially as Métamatics) that extended the Dada tradition into the later part of the 20th century. Tinguely's art satirized automation and the technological overproduction of material goods.

Life
Born in Fribourg, Tinguely grew up in Basel, and in 1941-1945 studied at the Kunstgewerbeschule. He moved to France in 1952 with his first wife, Swiss artist Eva Aeppli, to pursue a career in art. He belonged to the Parisian avantgarde in the mid-twentieth century and was one of the artists who signed the New Realist's manifesto (Nouveau réalisme) in 1960.

His best-known work, a self-destroying sculpture titled Homage to New York (1960), only partially self-destructed at the Museum of Modern Art, New York City, although his later work, Study for an End of the World No. 2 (1962), detonated successfully in front of an audience gathered in the desert outside Las Vegas.

Tinguely married fellow Swiss artist Eva Aeppli in 1951. In 1971 he married his second wife, Niki de Saint Phalle, with whom he collaborated on several artistic projects, such as the Hon – en katedral or Le Cyclop.

Tinguely died of heart failure in 1991 at the age of 66 years, in the Inselspital in Bern.

Public works
 Chaos I (1974), sculpture in The Commons, Columbus, Indiana, USA
 Le Cyclop outside of Milly-la-Forêt.
 The Stravinsky Fountain (fr: La Fontaine Stravinsky) near the Centre Pompidou, Paris (1983), a collaboration with Niki de Saint Phalle.
 Carnival Fountain (Fasnachtsbrunnen) (1977) in Basel.
 Tinguely Fountain (1977) in Basel.
 Lifesaver Fountain on Königstrasse in Duisburg, Germany, a collaboration with Niki de Saint Phalle
 Jo Siffert Fountain (commonly called Tinguely Fountain), Fribourg, Switzerland
 La Cascade, sculpture in the Carillon Building lobby, Charlotte, North Carolina, USA
 Métamatic generative sculptures (1950s)
 Luminator (1991), on loan until 2014 to the EuroAirport Basel-Mulhouse

Hon – en katedral
Hon – en katedral (Swedish: "She, a Cathedral") was an art installation made in collaboration with Niki de Saint-Phalle, that was shown at the Moderna Museet in Stockholm in 1966. The exhibition consisted of a sculpture of a colorful pregnant woman lying on her back with her legs wide apart. The sculpture was 25–26 meters long, about 6 meters high and 11 metres wide.  It was built of scaffolding and chicken wire covered with fabric and fiberglass, painted with brightly coloured poster paint. Through a door-sized entry in the location of the woman's vagina, visitors could go into the sculpture. Inside was a screen showing Greta Garbo films, a goldfish pond, and a soft drink vending machine. Johann Sebastian Bach's organ music played through speakers. The exhibition was created by Niki de Saint-Phalle, Tinguely and Per Olov Ultvedt. It had 80,000 visitors during the exhibition period from 4 June to 9 September 1966.

Noise music recordings
 1963 'Sounds of Sculpture', 7, Minami Gallery, Tokyo, Japan_[Tinguely's sculptures recorded by avant-garde composer Toshi Ichiyanagi during Japanese exhibition]
 1972 'Méta', book+7_, Propyläen Verlag, Stockholm
 1983 'Sculptures at The Tate Gallery, 1982'_, Audio Arts cassette
 1983 'Meta-Harmonie H' incl. in ‘Meridians 2_ compmqenan ate a pie
 2001 'Relief Meta-Mechanique Sonore I' incl. in 'A Diagnosis' compilation, Revolver-Archiv für Aktuelle Kunst, Frankfurt am Main, Germany

Influence on others
 In Arthur Penn's Mickey One (1965) the mime-like Artist (Kamatari Fujiwara) with his self-destructive machine is reminiscent of Tinguely
 Survival Research Laboratories, directed by Mark Pauline (USA)
 Prominent kinetic sculptor Arthur Ganson described Tinguely as his "primary spiritual artistic mentor", and paid homage to him in his work "Tinguely in Moscow".

Gallery of Works

See also 
New Realism
Useless machine
Arthur Ganson
Rube Goldberg

Further reading
Museum Tinguely in Basel
Chapter on Tinguely in Calvin Tomkins' The Bride and Her Bachelors.
K.G. Pontus Hultén: Jean Tinguely 'Méta'. London: Thames & Hudson, 1975 (original German version Frankfurt/M.: Ullstein, 1972)
G. Bischofsberger: Catalogue raisonné, 3 Vols. Basel, 1982.
Margit Hahnloser-Ingold: Pandämonium – Jean Tinguely. Bern: Benteli, 1988 (rather hagiographic, but with interesting personal memories and background material)
Heidi E. Violand: Jean Tinguely's Kinetic Art or A Myth of the Machine Age''. Diss, New York University, 1990
Museum Jean Tinguely (eds.): Die Sammlung. (The collection) Bern: Benteli, 1996 (incl. an interesting biographical report by Margit Hahnloser: "Jean Tinguely und die Schweiz")
Museum Jean Tinguely (eds.): Jean le Jeune. Basel: Benteli, 2002 (incl. a biographical text by Jocelyn Daignes about Tinguely's early love of materials and machines, his pacifism, and his Catholicism, p. 23-65).

References

External links

Tinguely-Museum in Basel
Biography by the Tinguely Museum in Basel
Art Cyclopaedia: Jean Tinguely
https://web.archive.org/web/20060210001214/http://www.art-public.com/cyclop/cyclop_g.htm
videos: Tinguely's kinetic fountains in Basel and Paris
Métamatic Research Initiative
Lecture by Kaira Cabañas (PhD, Princeton University) Homage to New York: Jean Tinguely's Destructive Art delivered November 20, 2008 in New York City at Museum of Modern Art
 

 
1925 births
1991 deaths
Neo-Dada
People from Fribourg
Swiss sculptors
20th-century Swiss artists
20th-century Swiss sculptors
20th-century male artists
20th-century Swiss painters
Swiss male painters
Swiss contemporary artists
Nouveau réalisme artists
20th-century sculptors
Modern sculptors
Swiss expatriates in France